Myrciaria puberulenta is a species of plant in the family Myrtaceae. It is endemic to evergreen moist forests in southern Venezuela and was first described in 2002. The Piaroa people cultivate it for its fruit and call it "kuyaeri".

Description
Myrciaria puberulenta is a tree which grows up to 15m tall, and produces dark purple fruits which are 25mm-35mm in diameter.

References

puberulenta
Crops originating from the Americas
Tropical fruit
Flora of South America
Fruits originating in South America
Cauliflory
Fruit trees
Berries
Plants described in 2002
Endemic flora of Venezuela